Tin Wan is an area at the south of Hong Kong Island, Hong Kong. It is at the west of Aberdeen and the east of Kellett Bay and Wah Fu Estate.

Housing

Tin Wan Estate is a public housing estate, also named after Tin Wan.

Hung Fuk Court is a housing estate built under the Home Ownership Scheme (or HOS), accommodating 1,946 people according to data provided by Centamap and Census and Statistic Department of Hong Kong.

Population
At the time of the 1911 census, the population of Tin Wan was 111. The number of males was 67.

According to the Population Census in 2016, the population in Tin Wan is about 17,012.

Points of interest
Ping Kee Restaurant, situated at Ka Wo Street, specialises in soup noodle dishes and is popular among residents of the area.

Education
SKH Tin Wan Chi Nam Primary School is also situated in Tin Wan, surrounded by apartment buildings of Tin Wan Estate.

Tin Wan is in Primary One Admission (POA) School Net 18. Within the school net are multiple aided schools (operated independently but funded with government money) and Hong Kong Southern District Government
Primary School.

See also
 Tin Wan Shan

References

 
Bays of Hong Kong
Southern District, Hong Kong